Volleyball is an event at the Island Games, the biennial multi-sports event for island nations, territories and dependencies.

Volleyball has been selected as a sport in every Island Games for both Men and Women since the games were started in 1985.

Beach Volleyball being introduced for the first time in 2007.

Volleyball 
 A maximum of one Team per gender may be entered by each Member Island
 Each team may have 12 competitors and 5 bench personnel
 Age - 13 minimum
'''Beach Volleyball 
 A maximum of one Team per gender may be entered by each Member Island
 Each team comprises 2 competitors per Member Island
 Age - 13 minimum

Events

Top Medalists

Volleyball

Men's Volleyball

Women's Volleyball

Beach Volleyball

Men's Beach Volleyball

Women's Beach Volleyball

References

 
Sports at the Island Games
Island Games
Island Games